The Leyenda de Plata (2014) was professional wrestling tournament produced by the Mexican wrestling promotion Consejo Mundial de Lucha Libre (CMLLl; Spanish "World Wrestling Council") that ran from December 20, 2013, over the course of three of CMLL's Friday night shows in Arena México with the finals on January 3, 2014. The annual Leyenda de Plata tournament is held in honor of lucha libre legend El Santo and is one of CMLL's most important annual tournaments.

After a two-year hiatus the Leyenda de Plata tournament returned in late 2013 with two qualifying Torneo cibernetico elimination matches and a final match between each elimination match winner. The first match took place on December 20, 2013, as part of CMLL's Super Viernes show and was won by Titán. The second torneo was won by Negro Casas a week later. On January 3, Casas defeated Titán to win the tournament.

Production

Background
The Leyenda de Plata (Spanish for "the Silver Legend") is an annual lucha libre tournament scripted and promoted by the Mexican professional wrestling promotion Consejo Mundial de Lucha Libre (CMLL).  The first Leyenda de Plata was held in 1998 and was in honor of El Santo, nicknamed Enmáscarado de Plata (the Silver mask) from which the tournament got its name. The trophy given to the winner is a plaque with a metal replica of the mask that El Santo wore in both wrestling and lucha films.

The Leyenda de Plata was held annually until 2003, at which point El Santo's son, El Hijo del Santo left CMLL on bad terms. The tournament returned in 2004 and has been held on an almost annual basis since then. The original format of the tournament was the Torneo cibernetico elimination match to qualify for a semi-final. The winner of the semi-final would face the winner of the previous year's tournament in the final. Since 2005 CMLL has held two cibernetico matches and the winner of each then meet in the semi-final. In 2011, the tournament was modified to eliminate the final stage as the previous winner, Místico, did not work for CMLL at that point in time The 2014 edition of La Leyenda de Plata was the 12th overall tournament held by CMLL.

Storylines
The events featured a total of number of professional wrestling matches with different wrestlers involved in pre-existing scripted feuds, plots and storylines. Wrestlers were portrayed as either heels (referred to as rudos in Mexico, those that portray the "bad guys") or faces (técnicos in Mexico, the "good guy" characters) as they followed a series of tension-building events, which culminated in a wrestling match or series of matches.

Tournament overview

Cibernetico 1 (December 20, 2013)

Cibernetico 2 (December 27, 2013)

Results

December 20, 2013

December 27, 2013

January 3, 2014

References

2014 in professional wrestling
Leyenda de Plata
Events in Mexico City
January 2014 events in Mexico